Seyedshahin Mousavi (born 25 April 1994) is an Iranian boxer. He competed in the men's middleweight event at the 2020 Summer Olympics.

References

External links
 

1994 births
Living people
Iranian male boxers
Olympic boxers of Iran
Boxers at the 2020 Summer Olympics
Asian Games competitors for Iran
Boxers at the 2018 Asian Games
People from Tehran Province
21st-century Iranian people